The following is the discography of the six-member South Korean girl group GFriend. The group has released four studio albums, one compilation album, ten extended plays, one repackaged album and nineteen singles.

Albums

Studio albums

Compilation albums

Reissues

Extended plays

Singles

Soundtrack appearances

Collaborations

Other charted songs

Music videos

Notes

References

Discographies
Discographies of South Korean artists
K-pop music group discographies